Thakurnagar railway station (Bengali: ঠাকুরনগর রেলওয়ে স্টেশন) is a small railway station in North 24 Parganas district, West Bengal. Its code is TKNR. It serves Thakurnagar town. The station consists of two platforms. The platform is very much well sheltered. This railway station is 63 km from Sealdah railway station on the Sealdah–Bangaon branch line.

History
Thakurnagar is a busy railway station. In 2009 the railway station was sanctioned as model station. Thakurnagar railway station is located on Sealdah–Hasnabad–Bangaon–Ranaghat line of Kolkata Suburban Railway. Link between Dum Dum to Khulna now in Bangladesh, via Bangaon was constructed by Bengal Central Railway Company in 1882–84. The Sealah–Dum Dum–Barasat–Ashok Nagar–Bangaon sector was electrified in 1963–64.

Communication System 
The Thakurnagar-Chandpara road passes by the station. Besides, the station is connected by road with Gaighata and Gobardanga. There are auto services from the station to Chandpara and Shutia, Gaighata, Charghat. For short distances there are rickshaw, van and toto services.

Modernization 
After serveral severe rail accidents, in 2016, Mamata Banerjee as Railway Minister proposed modernization of Thakurnagar station. Then two platforms of the station are fully covered with the shed. New ticket collection rooms were constructed.

Layout

See also

References

External links 

 Thakurnagar Station Map

 Thakurnagar station name will be renamed says Amit Shah

Sealdah railway division
Railway stations in North 24 Parganas district
Kolkata Suburban Railway stations